Brownwood can refer to:

Brownwood, Morgan County, Georgia
Brownwood, Missouri, an unincorporated community
Brownwood, Texas, a city
Brownwood (North Bloomfield, Ohio), on the National Register of Historic Places